Franciscus Ronaldus ("Ronald") Maria Jansen (born 30 December 1963 in Sint-Michielsgestel) is a former field hockey goalkeeper from the Netherlands, who twice won the gold medal at the Summer Olympics.

He played a total number of 183 international matches for his native country, and made his debut on 23 June 1987 at the 1987 Men's Hockey Champions Trophy in a match against Argentina.

External links
 
 Dutch Hockey Federation

1963 births
Living people
Male field hockey goalkeepers
Dutch male field hockey players
Olympic field hockey players of the Netherlands
Dutch field hockey coaches
Field hockey players at the 1988 Summer Olympics
Field hockey players at the 1996 Summer Olympics
1998 Men's Hockey World Cup players
Field hockey players at the 2000 Summer Olympics
Olympic gold medalists for the Netherlands
Olympic bronze medalists for the Netherlands
People from Sint-Michielsgestel
Olympic medalists in field hockey
Medalists at the 1988 Summer Olympics
Medalists at the 1996 Summer Olympics
Medalists at the 2000 Summer Olympics
HC Den Bosch players
Oranje Zwart players
20th-century Dutch people
21st-century Dutch people
Sportspeople from North Brabant